Rocket's Red Glare is an American television film that originally aired on Fox Family on August 27, 2000. The film stars Robert Wagner, Marilu Henner, and Ryan Merriman. Rocket's Red Glare was originally titled Mercury Project.

Premise
Teenager Todd Baker (Merriman) and his former astronaut grandfather Gus (Wagner) team up to rebuild a Mercury Redstone Rocket for Todd's school project.

Cast
 Robert Wagner as Gus Baker
 Ryan Merriman as Todd Baker
 Marilu Henner as Meg Baker
 Fred Coffin as Mitch Greer
 Danielle Fishel as Sarah Miller
 John Finn as Wyatt Claybourne
 Duane A. Lamb as himself (Col Lamb)
 Sarah Lancaster as Carol
 Clayton Landey as Colonel Vincenze
 Cory Pendergast as Jason Jones
 Joel Polis as Colonel Mitchell
 Taryn Reif as Jen Karsten
 Bill Timoney as Pete Baker
 Brandon Tyler as Vic Henry
 Matt Winston as Mr. Lake
 Alan Bean as Himself
 Gordon Cooper as Himself

References

External links
 

2000 films
2000s adventure films
ABC Family original films
American adventure films
Films shot in California
American space adventure films
Adventure television films
2000s English-language films
2000s American films